Sportsmans Park is an unincorporated community and census-designated place (CDP) in Wasco County, Oregon, United States. It was first listed as a CDP prior to the 2020 census.

The CDP is in western Wasco County, within Mount Hood National Forest, on the west shore of Rock Creek Reservoir.

Demographics

References 

Census-designated places in Wasco County, Oregon
Census-designated places in Oregon